Rugby union trophies and awards have been given out to teams and participants from the very earliest days of the sport's history. In common with many other sports rugby union has an array of competitions, both domestic international, covering the spectrum of competition structures from season long leagues, to one-off matches. The list below is divided into sections such that trophies and awards competed for by national sides are grouped together, as are those competed for by club and provincial sides. In both cases, the type of award can differ. The award might be a perpetual trophy, which is one competed for in perpetuity by two sides such that on each occasion they meet, which may or may not be on a regular basis, that honour is contested. The award may be one that is given to the winner of a tournament, or as a subset of this, as an award for a particular honour attained in that tournament. Additionally, the sport of rugby union bestows certain honours on individual players, and these too have their own dedicated section below.

International Trophies

Current international

Past International Trophies

International Honours not represented by Trophies

Domestic and Club Trophies

Current Domestic and Club Trophies

World Rugby Awards
 World Rugby Player of the Year
 World Rugby Team of the Year
 World Rugby Coach of the Year
 World Rugby Junior Player of the Year
 World Rugby Sevens Player of the Year
 IRB International Sevens Team of the Year
 IRB Award for Distinguished Service
 IRB Chairman's Award
 IRB Development Award
 IRB Distinguished Service Award
 World Rugby Hall of Fame
 IRB International U21 Player of the Year
 IRB International U19 Player of the Year
 IRB International Women’s Personality of the Year
 World Rugby Women's Player of the Year
 IRB International Young Player of the Year
 IRB Referee Award for Distinguished Service
 IRB Spirit of Rugby Award
 IRPA Special Merit Award
 IRPA Try of the Year
 Vernon Pugh Award for Distinguished Service

Halls of Fame
 World Rugby Hall of Fame
 International Rugby Hall of Fame
 World Rugby Museum Wall of Fame

See also

Laurie O'Reilly Cup, trophy competed for by the women's rugby union teams of Australia and New Zealand

Notes